Hamid Maleki (born 6 October 1996) is an Iranian footballer who plays as a left-back who currently plays for Iranian club Zob Ahan in the Persian Gulf Pro League.

References

1996 births
Living people
Iranian footballers
Zob Ahan Esfahan F.C. players
Association football defenders